"Rock Steady" is a song written and performed by Aretha Franklin and released in 1971, from the album Young, Gifted and Black. The single reached the #9 spot on the Billboard Hot 100 charts that same year. It also peaked at #2 on the Best Selling Soul Singles chart. The original A-side, a rendition of the song "Oh Me Oh My (I'm a Fool for You Baby)", peaked at #73 on the Billboard Hot 100 and #9 on the Best Selling Soul Singles chart.

Personnel
 Aretha Franklin – lead vocals, piano
 Donny Hathaway – electric piano, organ
 Bernard Purdie – drums
 Cornell Dupree – guitar
 Richard Tee – organ
 Chuck Rainey – bass guitar
 The Sweethearts of Soul (Brenda Bryant, Margaret Branch, Pat Smith)  — backing vocals
 Robert Popwell, Dr. John – percussion
 The Memphis Horns
 Wayne Jackson – trumpet
 Andrew Love – tenor saxophone
 Gene Paul – engineer
 Jerry Wexler – production
 Tom Dowd – horn arrangement, production
 Arif Mardin – production

Chart positions

Cover versions
 The earliest cover was a reggae version recorded by The Marvels on the Pama Supreme label c/w Be My Baby in 1971 
 The first known cover of the song was in 1972 by Sweet Salvation who recorded a whip-snapping cover for their sole eponymous album. 
 The Jackson Sisters recorded a cover of the song in 1976 for their eponymous album. 
 In 1987, a house version of the song was recorded by singer Dalis and released on Trax Records.
 Patti Austin covered the song on her 1994 album That Secret Place.
 Prince released a version on his 2007 live album, Indigo Nights. The song features Beverley Knight.
 In 2008 the song was sampled by Japanese R&B singer Namie Amuro in her own song, "Rock Steady".
 Richard Elliot also covered this song as an instrumental in 2010 off his album, which was also titled Rock Steady. Aretha's vocals were replaced by Rich's saxophone.
 Dawn Robinson of the group En Vogue did a solo cover of the song on 1998's Dr. Dolittle soundtrack.
 The song is used as a diegetic track in Driver: San Francisco. 
 Rap group People Under the Stairs mention the song in their song "The Next Step II".
 Daryl Hall and John Oates covered the song on their 2004 album Our Kind of Soul.
 Regina Love covered the song in The Voice (U.S. season 9).
 In 2012, Christine Anu covered the song on her album, Rewind: The Aretha Franklin Songbook.
Rap duo EPMD sampled the beat and Franklin's lyrics (more pronounced on the remix) for their 1989 single "I'm Housin" from their debut LP Strictly Business.
Spanish rock rap band Def Con Dos sampled the horn section of the song's chorus on their song "Promiscuidad".

Usage in media
The song was heard in the 2017 American comedy-drama film The Upside.
The song was used as an introduction to Ellen DeGeneres' Netflix stand-up comedy special, Relatable.

External links
 – session details

References

1971 singles
Aretha Franklin songs
Funk songs
Songs written by Aretha Franklin
Prince (musician) songs
Song recordings produced by Arif Mardin
Song recordings produced by Tom Dowd
Song recordings produced by Jerry Wexler
1971 songs
Atlantic Records singles